The Dushdi Mala Medal is a civil decoration in the honours system of Thailand, and the highest-ranked medal among those granted for services to the state. The award was established by King Chulalongkorn (Rama V) in 1882 to celebrate the centennial of the Rattanakosin Kingdom. Originally given in five categories, each with an associated pin attached as a medal bar, today it is only awarded for distinguished services in the domains of the arts and sciences, which is denoted by the Pin of Arts and Science (Sinlapa Witthaya).

History 
Thailand's modern honours system was established by King Mongkut (Rama IV, r. 1851–1868) and formalized by King Chulalongkorn in 1869. In 1882, to celebrate the centennial of the Rattanakosin Kingdom, Chulalongkorn created the Order of the Royal House of Chakri and the Dushdi Mala Medal. While the royal order would be granted only to members of the Royal Family, the medal was to be awarded for merit, both to military personnel and civilians, regardless of social rank.

The medal was originally granted in five categories, each with a particular pin to be attached as a medal bar. They were: Ratchakan Nai Phra-ong, for personal service to the king; Ratchakan Phaendin, for service to the country; Sinlapa Witthaya, for inventions benefiting the country, authorship advancing scientific knowledge, or expertise in a craft; Khwam Karuna, for charitable acts; and Klahan, for acts of bravery in the military.

When King Vajiravudh succeeded Chualongkorn in 1910, he created the Vajira Mala Order as his award for personal service, replacing the Dushdi Mala's use in that category. Other decorations likewise eventually rendered the three other categories of the Dushdi Mala redundant. In 1941 a new act of parliament was issued, repealing and replacing the original act. The new act modified the appearance of the medal, and removed the other categories of the award, leaving only the Sinlapa Witthaya pin to be granted to those exhibiting expertise in the arts and sciences.

By law, the Dushdi Mala Medal is granted at the discretion of the king, and this was followed in actual practice during its early years. As the academia advanced and the civil service grew, additional regulations were created to formalize the process. A 1928 regulation stipulated that the ministries would be responsible for the nomination of government officials under its command, subject to approval from the Royal Society. By 1978, this was again rewritten to allow non-government-employees to be nominated.

Appearance 

The Dushdi Mala Medal is oval-shaped. While the original medal could be made of any material, it is now made of gilded silver, according to the 1941 act. The obverse shows a portrait of King Chulalongkorn, with a laurel wreath below. On the reverse side is an image of Siam Devadhiraj, the guardian god of the country, standing on a platform, supporting the escutcheon (shield) of the coat of arms of Siam and holding a phuang malai (garland) above the name of the recipient. Below the platform is the number ๑๒๔๔ (1244), the Chulasakarat year of the medal's creation. Original medals are also signed "J.S. & A.B. WYON SC" in minute characters beneath the royal portrait.

The medal is attached to a suspension device in the shape of a crossed Sword of Victory and Royal Staff beneath a plate bearing the words "ทรงยินดี" ("with royal pleasure"). The Sinlapa Witthaya pin is a bar with the words "ศิลปวิทยา" ("arts and sciences") and lotus motifs on both ends.

Conferment 
According to the 1978 regulation and its later amendments, nominees should have created or greatly improved upon knowledge, systems, processes or inventions, or demonstrated outstanding expertise and fame in the arts and sciences, with their work having exhibited great benefit to the country. Nominations may be put forward by the ministries, the Office of the National Research Council, the Royal Society, university councils, professional organizations, and previous awardees in the same field. The nominations are considered by a special committee, which will make a recommendation for the prime minister to forward to the Royal Household.

The medal is awarded by the King of Thailand, or by an appointee on behalf of the king. Conferred medals are property of the recipient and their heirs, but may be revoked in case of misconduct unbefitting of the award.

Gallery

Recipients

1882–1941

1941–present

References 

Civil awards and decorations of Thailand
Academic awards
Awards established in 1882
1882 establishments in Siam